Raymond Fearon is an English actor. He played garage mechanic Nathan Harding on ITV's long-running soap opera Coronation Street and voiced the centaur Firenze in the Wizarding World film series Harry Potter and Fantastic Beasts.

Career

Theatre 
After studying drama at Rose Bruford College, Fearon went on to make his reputation as a stage actor, working at Liverpool's Everyman Theatre; Manchester Contact Theatre; Manchester Royal Exchange; Oxford Playhouse; Barn Theatre, Kent; The Almeida; The Crucible, Sheffield; The Donmar Warehouse; The Royal Shakespeare Theatres in Stratford and the National Theatre. He has also toured in the United States and Europe and the Far East.

Fearon starred in Othello—opposite Gillian Kearney's Desdemona— in Liverpool at the age of 24, becoming the first black actor to play Othello on RSC main stages for over 40 years. His other early stage roles included Charles Surface in The School for Scandal; Betty/Martin in Cloud Nine; Longaville in Love's Labour's Lost; Ferdinand in The Tempest; and Pete in Blues for Mr Charlie.

His early theatre work in London included Hugo/Frederick in Ring Round the Moon at the Lilian Baylis Theatre; the title role in The Invisible Man (his one-man show) at the Bridewell Theatre; and Pierre in Venice Preserv'd at the Almeida.

He has worked extensively with the Royal Shakespeare Company in their Stratford and London theatres and on tour. He was the first black actor to play the title role in Othello in the main Royal Shakespeare theatre (director Michael Attenborough, 1999) giving a performance alongside Richard McCabe's strong and repressed Iago. They also played opposite one another in 1996's The White Devil (Deborah Warner, Swan theatre) where he played Brachiano and McCabe the villain Flamineo. Fearon was directed by Attenborough also as Romeo in Romeo and Juliet (RSC, Swan Theatre, 1997) alongside Zoe Waites as Juliet.

Other RSC roles have included the First Knight and First Tempter in Murder in the Cathedral (Swan, 1993), Stubb in Moby Dick (TOP, 1993), the Prince of Morocco in The Merchant of Venice (RST, 1994), Paris in Troilus and Cressida (Ian Judge, RST, 1996), the Marquis of Posa in Don Carlos (1999), Pericles in Adrian Noble's Pericles, Prince of Tyre (RST and Roundhouse, 2002) and Mark Antony in Julius Caesar (2012).

In 2003, he played 'Oberon' in A Midsummer Night's Dream at Sheffield's Crucible Theatre. In 2004, he appeared in as Jean Kiyabe in World Music by Steve Waters at the Donmar Warehouse, and in the same year at the National Theatre as Mark in Sing Yer Hearts Out for the Lads by Roy Williams.

In 2010, he starred as Walter Lee Younger in A Raisin in the Sun by Lorraine Hansberry. This critically acclaimed production was directed by Michael Buffong at the Royal Exchange, Manchester.

In July 2013 he played Macduff opposite Kenneth Branagh (as Macbeth) and Alex Kingston (as Lady Macbeth) in Macbeth at Manchester International Festival. His performance was broadcast to cinemas on 20 July as part of National Theatre Live.

In December 2017 he played Nathan Detroit in Guys and Dolls at the Royal Exchange, Manchester. The production was directed by Michael Buffong.

Television, film and radio 
Fearon played Nathan Harding in Coronation Street from 2005 to 2006 and in 2001 he appeared in Harry Potter and the Philosopher's Stone (as Firenze the centaur). He had a minor role as a sentry in Kenneth Branagh's 1996 film version of Hamlet.

He was in the 2006 series of Strictly Come Dancing, partnered by Camilla Dallerup, and was voted out in week 6.

He also appeared as a fictionalised version of historical figure Carlo de' Medici on the Starz series Da Vinci's Demons, which ran from 2013 to 2015.

In 2019, Fearon played the role of Hot Misogynist in season two of the acclaimed BBC Three comedy-drama Fleabag.

In the BBC's 2003 radio adaptation of His Dark Materials, Fearon appeared as the narrator and as the angel Balthamos.

Filmography

References

External links 
 

Living people
20th-century English male actors
21st-century English male actors
Alumni of Rose Bruford College
Black British male actors
English male film actors
English male soap opera actors
English male television actors
Year of birth missing (living people)